Soutelo may refer to the following places in Portugal:

 Soutelo (Chaves), a civil parish in the municipality of Chaves
 Soutelo (Mogadouro), a civil parish in the municipality of Mogadouro
 Soutelo (Vieira do Minho), a civil parish in the municipality of Vieira do Minho
 Soutelo (Vila Verde), a civil parish in the municipality of Vila Verde
 Soutelo de Aguiar, a civil parish in the municipality of Vila Pouca de Aguiar
 Soutelo do Douro, a civil parish in the municipality of São João da Pesqueira
 Soutelo Mourisco, a civil parish in the municipality of Macedo de Cavaleiros